This is a list of medalists from the World Orienteering Championships in women's orienteering.

Individual/Classic/Long
This event was called "Individual" from 1966 to 1989 and "Classic distance" from 1991 to 2001. Since 2003 it is called "Long distance".

Short/Middle
This event was first held in 1991. The format was changed and renamed "Middle Distance" in 2003 with the introduction of the Sprint discipline.

Sprint
This event was first held in 2001.

Knock-out Sprint
This event was first held in 2022.

Relay

Medal table
Table updated after the 2019 Championships.

Multiple medalists

Best performers by country 
Including mixed events

An asterisk (*) marks athletes who are the only representatives of their respective countries to win a medal.

References

External links
 International Orienteering Federation
 World Orienteering Championships, senior statistics 1966–2005

medalists
Orienteering